A Noisy Day is a 1960 Soviet comedy film directed by Anatoly Efros and Georgy Natanson.

Plot 
The film tells about a close-knit Soviet family, in whose house everything was wonderful, until a conflict of two different worldviews occurred.

Cast 
 Valentina Sperantova as Klavdiya Vasilevna Savina
 Gennadi Pechnikov as Fedor
 Tatyana Nadezhdina as Tatyana
 Vladimir Zemlyanikin as Nikolay
 Oleg Tabakov as Oleg
 Liliya Tolmacheva as Lenochka
 Yevgeny Perov as Lapshin
 Lev Kruglyy as Gennadi (as Lev Kruglyj)
 Viktoriya Dukhina as Marina
 Robert Chumak as Leonid Pavlovich (as R. Chumak)
 Inna Gulaya as Fira

References

External links 
 

1960 films
1960s Russian-language films
Soviet teen films